Frederick William Edwin Tomlins (5 August 1919 – 20 June 1943) was a British figure skater. He was the 1939 World silver medalist and European silver medalist. He competed at the 1936 Winter Olympics and placed 10th.

Military service and death
Tomlins served as a pilot officer in the Royal Air Force Volunteer Reserve during the Second World War. On 20 June 1943, he took part in an anti-submarine mission aboard Armstrong Whitworth Whitley LA814 with Coastal Command. During the mission, the aircraft engaged a U-boat and was shot down in flames with all aboard killed. Tomlins is commemorated on the Runnymede Memorial.

Results

References

External links
 
 
 

1919 births
1943 deaths
British male single skaters
Olympic figure skaters of Great Britain
Figure skaters at the 1936 Winter Olympics
Royal Air Force personnel killed in World War II
Royal Air Force Volunteer Reserve personnel of World War II
People from Lambeth
World Figure Skating Championships medalists
European Figure Skating Championships medalists
Royal Air Force officers
Military personnel from London